This is a list of soccer stadiums in Australia, ranked in descending order of capacity. There is an extremely large number of soccer stadiums and pitches in Australia, and a definitive list of stadium would be impossible to produce. This list therefore includes:

 The stadiums of all 12 clubs in the A-League Men as of the 2022–23 season.
 The stadiums of all 11 clubs in the A-League Women as of the 2022–23 season.
 All stadiums in Australia played by the Australia men's national soccer team and Australia women's national soccer team.
 All other soccer stadiums with a capacity of at least 5,000.

Existing stadiums

Future stadiums
Stadiums which are currently in development include:

See also

 List of record home attendances of Australian soccer clubs
 List of A-League Men stadiums
 List of Australian Football League grounds
 List of Australian cricket grounds
 List of ice rinks in Australia
 List of indoor arenas in Australia
 List of National Basketball League (Australia) venues
 List of Australian rugby league stadiums
 List of Australian rugby union stadiums
 List of Oceanian stadiums by capacity

References

External links

Australia
Soccer
 
Stadiums